Kenneth Gainwell (born March 14, 1999) is an American football running back for the Philadelphia Eagles of the National Football League (NFL). He played college football for Memphis.

Early life and high school
Gainwell grew up in Yazoo City, Mississippi and attended Yazoo County High School. He was a three-year starter at quarterback for the Panthers. As a junior, he passed for 1,184 yards and nine touchdowns and rushed for 1,292 yards and 20 touchdowns. During the summer going into his senior season Gainwell committed to play college football at Memphis over offers from Ole Miss and Tulane. As a senior, he passed for 1,139 yards and 10 touchdowns and ran for 1,834 yards and 32 touchdowns. Gainwell was named Class 3A Mr. Football as he led the Panthers to a 14–1 record and an appearance in the Class 3A state championship game. Gainwell finished his high school career with 3,682 yards passing and 32 passing touchdowns and 4,730 rushing yards and 75 rushing touchdowns with one kickoff returned for a touchdown.

College career
Gainwell moved to running back during summer training camp and played in four games as a true freshman before deciding to redshirt the rest of the season. He finished the season with four carries for 91 yards and a touchdown, a 73-yard run, and six receptions for 52 yards.

As a redshirt freshman, Gainwell was named the Tigers' starting running back following the departure of Tony Pollard. He was named the co-American Athletic Conference (AAC) player of the week after rushing for 104 yards and a touchdown and gaining 204 yards and scoring two touchdowns on nine receptions on October 19, 2019, in a 47–17 win over Tulane. He rushed for 1,459 yards with 13 touchdowns on 231 carries and caught 51 passes for 610 yards and three touchdowns and was named the AAC Freshman of the Year and first-team All-AAC. He was named a second-team All-American by the Sporting News and the American Football Coaches Association and the National Freshman of the Year by the Football Writers Association of America.

Gainwell opted out of his final college season six days before the season opener after multiple family members died from COVID-19.

Professional career

Gainwell was selected in the fifth round (150th overall) by the Philadelphia Eagles in the 2021 NFL Draft. Gainwell was happy to be drafted by Philadelphia, as he grew up an Eagles fan, and his favorite player while growing up, Darren Sproles, works for the team as a consultant. Gainwell also said that he modeled his game after Sproles. He signed his four-year rookie contract with Philadelphia on June 3, 2021. Gainwell found moderate success as a rookie, as he ended the year with 68 carries for 291 yards and five touchdowns, while adding 33 receptions for 253 yards and one touchdown. Gainwell appeared in 16 games as a rookie, as he was a healthy scratch for the Eagles' week 11 showdown with the New Orleans Saints.

In the 2022 season, Gainwell had 53 carries for 240 rushing yards and four rushing touchdowns to go along with 23 receptions for 169 receiving yards.  In the team's 38-7 Divisional Round victory over the New York Giants, he had 10 carries for a career high 112 yards and a touchdown, as well as one reception for nine yards. This performance made him just the sixth Eagles player to rush for at least 100 yards in a postseason game. Gainwell helped the Eagles reach Super Bowl LVII where they lost 38-35 to the Kansas City Chiefs. In the Super Bowl, Gainwell had seven carries for 21 rushing yards and four receptions for 20 receiving yards.

Personal life
Gainwell's younger brother, Kory, played defensive back and running back at Yazoo County and is committed to play at Memphis. Gainwell is the cousin of fellow Eagles player Fletcher Cox.

References

External links

Philadelphia Eagles bio
Memphis Tigers bio

1999 births
Living people
American football running backs
Memphis Tigers football players
Players of American football from Mississippi
People from Yazoo City, Mississippi
Philadelphia Eagles players